The 2006 Australian Provincial Championship (APC), held in September, was the inaugural season of a competition between Australia's four Super 14 rugby union sides. Following a round robin phase, a final was held between the two top sides, with the Brumbies victorious over the Queensland Reds.

Table
{| class="wikitable"
|-border=1 cellpadding=5 cellspacing=0
! width="20"|Pos
! width="150"|　Name
! width="20"|Pld
! width="20"|W
! width="20"|D
! width="20"|L
! width="20"|F
! width="20"|A
! width="25"|+/-
! width="20"|BP
! width="20"|Pts
|- align=center bgcolor="#c0c0c0"
|align=left|1
|align=left|Brumbies
|3||2||0||1||58||43||15||1||9
|- align=center bgcolor="#c0c0c0"
|align=left|2
|align=left|Queensland Reds
|3||2||0||1||65||68||-3||1||9
|- align=center 
|align=left|3
|align=left|Western Force
|3||1||0||2||75||72||3||2||6
|- align=center
|align=left|4
|align=left|New South Wales Waratahs
|3||1||0||2||71||86||-15||2||6
|}

Table notes
Pos = Table Position
Pld = Played
W   = Win (Worth 4 points)
D   = Draw (Worth 2 points)
L   = Loss (Worth 0 points)
F   = For (Total points scored)
A   = Against (Total points scored against)
+/- = Points difference (The total of For minus Against points)
BP  = Bonus Point (Teams can score additional bonus points by certain scenarios. 1 Bonus point will be awarded to any team that scores 4 tries or more regardless of win/loss/draw. A bonus point will be awarded to the losing side if the loss is by 7 points or less. It is possible to receive 2 (two) bonus points in loss.)
Pts = Progressive points tally

Tiebreaker rules
At the end of the regular season, the two top teams will advance to the final. However, if one or more teams finish on the same number of points, tiebreakers will be applied in the following order:
Differential between points scored and allowed in the round-robin phase.
Head-to-head result(s) between the tied team(s).
Number of tries scored in the round-robin phase.

Draw
All kick-off times are local (AEST)

Round One

Round Two

Round Three

Final

Notes

Provincial Championship
Australian Provincial Championship
Aus
Australia